The Journal of Applied Corporate Finance is a quarterly academic journal covering research in corporate finance, including risk management, corporate strategy, corporate governance, and capital structure. It also features roundtable discussions among corporate executives and academics on topics such as integrity in financial reporting. It was established in 1988 and is published by Wiley-Blackwell. The editor-in-chief is Donald H. Chew, Jr. From 2004 to 2013, the journal was owned by Morgan Stanley, but is now owned and operated by its editors and by Carl Ferenbach, a retired private equity investor.

References

External links 
 
 Journal of Applied Corporate Finance website

Wiley-Blackwell academic journals
Publications established in 1988
Quarterly journals
Business and management journals
English-language journals
Finance journals